Levantine cuisine is the traditional cuisine of the Levant.

Perhaps the most distinctive aspect of Levantine cuisine is meze including tabbouleh, hummus and baba ghanoush.

Levantine dishes

 Arabic coffee (قهوة عربية)—made from finely ground coffee beans with cardamom
 Awameh (عوامة)—a fried-dough Levantine pastry similar to doughnut holes, made of deep-fried dough soaked in sugar syrup or honey and cinnamon, sometimes sprinkled with sesame seeds
 Baba ghanoush (بابا غنوج)—a dip made from baked, mashed eggplant mixed with lemon, garlic, olive oil and various seasonings
 Baklava (بقلاوة)—a dessert made of phyllo pastry filled with chopped nuts and soaked in syrup
 Bamia (بامية)—a stew prepared with chunks of lamb meat with okra in a tomato-based sauce, served over rice
 Basbousa (بسبوسة)—a Middle-Eastern small, sweet cake of cooked semolina soaked in rose water syrup, topped with almonds or walnuts
 Challah (חלה)—a Jewish egg-bread, primarily eaten on Shabbat and holidays
 Dolma (محشي)—vegetables, typically aubergines, courgettes, onions, peppers or tomatoes, stuffed with minced meat and rice
 Falafel (فلافل)—spiced mashed chickpeas formed into balls or fritters and deep fried, usually eaten with or in pita bread with hummus
 Fasoulia (فاصوليا)—a stew prepared with white beans and meat served over rice
 Fatteh (فتّة)—chicken over rice, topped with yogurt and pita bread
 Fattoush (فتوش)—a salad of chopped cucumber, radish, tomato and other vegetables, with fried or toasted pita bread
 Freekeh (فريكة)—a cereal food made from green durum wheat that is roasted and rubbed to create its flavour, then served with cumin, cinnamon, and fresh lamb-tail fat
 Ful medames  (فول مدمس)—ground fava beans and olive oil
 Ful medames salad (سلطة فول مدمس)—a salad with fava beans, chopped tomatoes, onion, parsley, lemon juice, olive oil, pepper and salt
 Halva (حلاوة)—a flour- or nut-based confection including fruit or nuts
 Hamin—a Jewish stew made with beef, chickpeas, beans, chicken stock, spices, lemon juice, garlic, barley, yellow potato, white onion, and sweet potato
 Hummus (حمّص)—a thick paste or spread made from ground chickpeas and olive oil, lemon, and garlic; also common in Egypt
 Hummus  salad (سلطة حمص)—an Arab salad with cooked chickpeas, lemon juice, garlic, tahini, salt, olive oil, and cumin
Jerusalem mixed grill (מעורב ירושלמי)—chicken hearts, spleens and livers mixed with bits of lamb cooked on a flat grill, seasoned with onion, garlic, black pepper, cumin, turmeric, olive oil and coriander
 Ka'ak (كعك)—a type of biscuit/cookie shaped into a ring, occasionally sprinkled with sesame seeds
 Kabsa (كبسة)—a rice-based dish commonly eaten with meat, lamb or chicken, cooked in a variety of spices and topped with nuts over rice
 Kanafeh (كنافة)—a dessert made with shredded filo and melted cheese soaked in a sugary syrup
 Kebab (كباب)—a dish of ground beef or lamb, grilled or roasted on a skewer
 Kebab karaz (كباب كرز)—a type of kebab made of lamb meatballs in a cherry-based broth with pine nuts and sour cherries over pita bread
 Kibbeh (كبة)—a dumpling-like dish of ground lamb with bulgur wheat or rice and seasonings, eaten cooked or raw
 Kibbeh nayyeh (كبة نيئة)—a mezze of minced raw meat mixed with fine bulgur and various seasonings
 Kousa mahshi (كوسا محشي)—courgettes baked and stuffed with minced meat and rice in a tomato-based sauce
 Labneh (لبنة)—yogurt that has been strained to remove its whey; most popular as a breakfast food
 Lentil soup (شوربة عدس)—may be vegetarian or include meat, using brown, red, yellow or black lentils, with or without the husk
 Levantine salad—a salad of diced tomato, cucumber, onion, sometimes parsley, dressed with lemon juice and olive oil; other popular salads include artichoke salad, beet salad, avocado salad, fattoush and tabouli
 Limonana (ليمون نعناع)—lemonade made from freshly-squeezed lemon juice and mint leaves
 Ma'amoul (معمول)—semolina shortbread cookies filled with dates or walnuts, commonly sprinkled with sugar
 Makdous (مكدوس)—stuffed oil-cured baby aubergines
 Malfouf salad (سلطة ملفوف)—a salad of lemon juice, olive oil, garlic, salt, and mint
 Manakish (مناقيش)—a pizza-like flatbread garnished with minced meat, thyme or za'atar, commonly eaten for breakfast or dinner
 Mansaf (منسف)—lamb or chicken cooked in a sauce of fermented dried yogurt and served over rice
 Maqluba (مقلوبة)—a rice-based casserole with meat, rice, and fried vegetables in a pot, which is flipped upside down when served, hence the name, which literally translates as "upside-down"
 Markook (مرقوق)—a thin, unleavened flatbread baked on an iron griddle known as saj
 Mfarakeh (مفركة)—an Arab dish made of potato, egg, ghee, cumin powder, salt and pepper, with chopped coriander leaf as garnish
 Muhammara (محمرة)—a hot pepper dip made from fresh or dried peppers, breadcrumbs, olive oil, spices and ground walnuts
 Mujaddara (مجدرة)—cooked lentils with groats, generally rice, garnished with sautéed onions
 Mulukhiyah (ملوخية)—a stew cooked with mallow leaves,  mucillagenous like okra, eaten with chicken in a thick broth
 Musakhan (مسخّن)—a classic Palestinian dish, a whole roasted chicken baked with onions, sumac, allspice, saffron, and fried pine nuts served over taboon bread
 Pita (خبز عربي)—a soft, slightly leavened flatbread baked from wheat flour
 Ptitim (פתיתים)—literally "flakes", a type of toasted pasta shaped like rice grains, developed in Israel in the 1950s when rice was scarce
 Qamar al-Din (قمر الدين)—a thick, cold apricot drink typically served during the month of Ramadan
 Qarymutah (القريموطة), a simple way to prepare bulgur in rural areas of Homs, Hama and Salamiyah. Bulgur is cooked with vegetables and wrapped in grape leaves
 Qatayef (قطايف)—a dessert commonly served during the month of Ramadan, a sweet dumpling filled with cream or nuts
 Qidreh (قدرة)—a lamb stew with chickpeas, garlic and spices, commonly served over rice
 Quzi (قوزي)—a hearty dish of roasted lamb with raisins, nuts and spices over rice or wrapped in taboon bread
 Raheb (سلطة راهب)—a salad with aubergines and tomatoes, popular in the Middle East.
Sabich (סביח)—an Israeli sandwich, in pita, filled with eggplant, spices, salads, hard-boiled eggs, and amba
 Sambusac (سمبوسك)—a triangular savory pastry fried in ghee or oil with spiced vegetables or meat
 Sfiha (صفيحة)—open-faced meat pies made with ground mutton, lamb or beef
 Shanklish (شنكليش)—cow's or sheep's milk cheese formed into balls, rolled in Aleppo pepper and za'atar, then aged and dried
 Shashlik (شاشليك)—skewered and grilled cubes of meat
 Shawarma (شاورما)—roasted meat, cooked on a revolving spit and shaved for serving in sandwiches
 Shish kebab (شيش كباب)—grilled or roasted chunks of meat on a skewer, commonly served over flatbread or rice
 Sumaghiyyeh (سماقية)—ground sumac is soaked in water then mixed with tahina (sesame-seed paste), water and flour, added to sautéed chopped chard, pieces of slow-stewed beef, and garbanzo beans
 Tabbouleh (تبولة)—a salad of bulgur mixed with finely chopped parsley, minced onions and tomatoes
 Tahini (طحينة)—condiment made of ground and hulled sesame seeds, primary ingredient baba ghanoush and hummus
 Tepsi (تبسي بيتنجان)— a casserole baked with minced meat, aubergine, potato and tomato slices, served with pickles, rice and salad
 Toum (توم)—a paste containing garlic, olive oil and salt, typically used as a dip
 Warbat (وربات)—a sweet pastry with thin layers of phyllo pastry filled with custard, popularly eaten during Ramadan
 Za'atar (زَعْتَر)—a condiment of dried herbs mixed with sesame seeds, dried sumac, and often salt, as well as other spices
 Zalabia (زلابية)—a fried dough pastry shaped as balls or discs, often dipped in a sweet syrup
 Zibdieh (زبدية)—a clay-pot dish of shrimp baked in a stew of olive oil, garlic, hot peppers, and peeled tomatoes

Geographical varieties of Levantine cuisine

 Assyrian cuisine
 Mesopotamian cuisine
 Syrian cuisine
 Lebanese cuisine
 Egyptian cuisine
 Israeli cuisine
 Jordanian cuisine
 Turkish cuisine
 Ottoman cuisine
 Cypriot cuisine
 Palestinian cuisine
 Kurdish cuisine

See also

 Arab cuisine
 Jewish cuisine
 Greek cuisine
 Iranian cuisine

References

Bibliography

Further reading
 Sami Zubaida, "National, Communal and Global Dimensions in Middle Eastern Food Cultures" in Sami Zubaida and Richard Tapper, A Taste of Thyme: Culinary Cultures of the Middle East, London and New York, 1994 and 2000, p. 35.
 Jean Bottéro, The Oldest Cuisine in the World: Cooking in Mesopotamia, University of Chicago Press, 2004,

External links

 
Arab cuisine
Israeli cuisine
Mediterranean cuisine
Middle Eastern cuisine
Turkish cuisine